Alfred "Dutch" Skinner (January 26, 1894 – April 11, 1961) was a Canadian ice hockey right winger. During his career, which lasted from 1913 to 1930, he played for several teams in the National Hockey Association, National Hockey League, and Pacific Coast Hockey Association. His longest tenure was with the Vancouver Millionaires (later Maroons) of the PCHA. With the Toronto Arenas he won the Stanley Cup in 1918, and played for the Cup a further three times with Vancouver.

Playing career
Skinner played junior hockey for the Toronto Argonauts (1911–12) and the Parkdale Canoe Club (1912–13) and senior hockey with the Toronto Rowing Club (1913–14). He turned professional in 1914 with the Toronto Shamrocks of the National Hockey Association. After one season, the team evolved into the Toronto Blueshirts. During the 1916–17 season, the league suspended operations of the Blueshirts, and Skinner finished the season with the Montreal Wanderers.

With the creation of the National Hockey League in 1917, Skinner returned to Toronto and played for the Stanley Cup-winning Toronto Arenas club, which consisted mostly of Toronto Blueshirts players. Skinner was the offensive star of the Cup championships, scoring eight goals in five games in the 1918 Stanley Cup Finals.

During the 1917–18 NHL season Skinner was also involved in a violent tussle with Montreal Canadiens defenceman Joe Hall, during a game on January 28, 1918. Both players were arrested for assault and appeared in a Toronto court together on January 29 where both were released after being handed a suspended sentence.

In 1919, Skinner went west to play for Vancouver in the Pacific Coast Hockey Association. The team unsuccessfully challenged for the Stanley Cup in 1921 and 1922. The 1920–21 season was Skinner's best, when he scored 20 goals in 24 games.

When the PCHA merged with the Western Canada Hockey League in 1924, Skinner returned to the NHL to play for the Boston Bruins. He was traded during the season to the Montreal Maroons and finished the year with just one goal in 27 games. He was signed by the Pittsburgh Pirates to start the 1925–26 season, but only played seven games with the team, ending his NHL career.

In 1926–27, Skinner played in the minor professional American Hockey Association for the Duluth Hornets. For the next two seasons, he was player-coach for Kitchener in the Canadian Professional Hockey League. When that league became the International Hockey League in 1929, Skinner became player-coach for the Guelph Maple Leafs in the new Canadian Professional Hockey League. He led the team to the championship in the league's only year of operations. He retired as a player in 1930.

Outside of hockey, Skinner was an employee of the City of Toronto and served a term as president of the Spadina Men's Progressive Conservative Association. He died in April, 1961 at age 67 at his home in Toronto and was buried at Mount Pleasant Cemetery, Toronto.

Career statistics

Regular season and playoffs

References

External links

1894 births
1961 deaths
Boston Bruins players
Canadian ice hockey right wingers
Kitchener Millionaires players
Montreal Maroons players
Montreal Wanderers (NHA) players
Pittsburgh Pirates (NHL) players
Ice hockey people from Toronto
Stanley Cup champions
Toronto Arenas players
Toronto Blueshirts players
Toronto Shamrocks players
Vancouver Maroons players
Vancouver Millionaires players